Mark Stone (born 12 June 1969) is a British baritone appearing in concerts, recitals, and opera.

Biography

Early life
Born in London, England, he studied at Wilson's School, Wallington, London, before going up to King's College, Cambridge to read mathematics. After graduating in 1990, he worked as a Chartered Accountant and as an investment banker before studying singing at the Guildhall School of Music and Drama, London from 1995 to 1998.

Performing
He made his operatic debut in 1998, singing the role of Escamillo for Opera North, since when he has also appeared in the UK at the Royal Opera House, English National Opera, Glyndebourne and Welsh National Opera. He made his U.S. debut for the Opera Company of Philadelphia and went on to sing at Santa Fe Opera. Elsewhere he has sung for La Scala (Milan), Opera Nationale de Montpellier, Liceu (Barcelona), Deutsche Oper Berlin, Cologne Opera, Leipzig Opera, the Royal Swedish Opera, Nationale Reisoper (Enschede), Israeli Opera and New Zealand Opera.

In 2016 he premiered the role of The Count in Elena Langer's opera Figaro Gets a Divorce, for Welsh National Opera.

He appears regularly in concert, having sung with the London Symphony Orchestra, the Hallé Orchestra, the Academy of Ancient Music, the Oxford Lieder Festival, the Philharmonia Orchestra, the BBC Concert Orchestra, the City of Birmingham Symphony Orchestra, the Bamberg Symphony Orchestra, the Munich Radio Orchestra, the Danish National Symphony Orchestra, the Berlin Radio Symphony Orchestra (East Berlin), the Orquesta Sinfónica de Castilla y Léon and the Orquesta Sinfónica de Galicia.

Record producing
In 2008 he formed the CD label Stone Records. Originally created to release his own recordings, the label expanded, as Stone began to release discs from other artists, and the catalogue now includes vocal, choral, orchestral and instrumental music. Artists include American guitarist Aaron Larget-Caplan with the 2015 issue of 'The Legend of Hagoromo'.

Repertoire

Operatic

Concert

Discography

References

External links
 Artist's website
 Management website
 CD label website

English operatic baritones
Alumni of the Guildhall School of Music and Drama
Alumni of King's College, Cambridge
Living people
1969 births
Choral Scholars of the Choir of King's College, Cambridge